Beqaasem (Arabic: بقعسم) is a Syrian village in the Qatana District of the Rif Dimashq Governorate. According to the Syria Central Bureau of Statistics (CBS), Beqaasem had a population of 2,268 in the 2004 census. Its inhabitants are predominantly Druze.

History
In 1838, Eli Smith noted Beqaasem's population as Druze.

References

Bibliography

 

Druze communities in Syria
Populated places in Qatana District